The Cherek is a river in Kabardino-Balkaria in Russia, a right tributary of the Baksan (Terek basin). The Cherek is formed by the confluence of the Cherek-Balkarsky and Cherek-Khulamsky, both of which originate in the glaciers of the northern slopes of the Greater Caucasus, one of them being the Bezengi Glacier. The river Nalchik flows into the Urvan, which is a branch of the Cherek.

Gallery

References 

Rivers of Kabardino-Balkaria